Paek Nam-il is a North Korean politician.  He has been a delegate to the past four sessions of the Supreme People's Assembly:  the 8th beginning in 1986, the 9th beginning in 1990, the 10th beginning in 1998, and the 11th beginning in 2003.

See also

Politics of North Korea

References
Yonhap News Agency.  "Who's who, North Korea," pp. 787–812 in 

Members of the Supreme People's Assembly
Living people
Year of birth missing (living people)